The year 2005 was the 34th year after the independence of Bangladesh. It was also the fifth year of the third term of the government of Khaleda Zia.

Incumbents

 President: Iajuddin Ahmed
 Prime Minister: Khaleda Zia
 Chief Justice: Syed Jillur Rahim Mudasser Husain

Demography

Climate

Economy

Note: For the year 2005 average official exchange rate for BDT was 64.33 per US$.

Events
7 January - There was an accidental blowout at the Chhatak gas field at Tengratial, just a few days after Niko Resources started drilling there.
11 January – Bangladesh register their first Test match victory against Zimbabwe.
27 January – Veteran politician and former Finance Minister Shah A M S Kibria is assassinated along with two of his aides in a grenade attack at Habiganj.
25 February – Bangladeshi U.N. peacekeepers were ambushed and at least nine were killed in the Democratic Republic of the Congo.
11 April – A nine-story commercial building collapsed due to a structural failure leading to 73 deaths in the Savar Upazila of Dhaka.
23 April – Protests erupt in the city of Bogra against the Ahmadiya community.
18 June – Bangladesh pull off one of the biggest shocks in cricket history by beating world champions Australia.
24 June - While Niko was drilling a relief well to contain the fire from the first blowout at the Chhatak gas field at Tengratial, another blowout occurred at the same field.
17 August – a series of bomb blasts are detonated simultaneously across 63 of 64 districts in Bangladesh.
3 October – A series of synchronized bombings targeted courts in Chandpur, Chittagong, and Lakshmipur and resulted in 2 deaths and 34 injuries. It was carried out by Jamaat-ul-Mujahideen Bangladesh, an Islamist terrorist organisation, that opposed secular judiciary and legal system in Bangladesh.
14 November – Two senior assistant judges are killed in the bombing of a car transporting Judges to the District Court of Jhalakathi. Jama'atul Mujahideen Bangladesh (JMB) claimed responsibility for the bombings. The group, led by Shaykh Abdur Rahman and Siddiqur Rahman (also known as Bangla Bhai).
29 November – Another series of simultaneous suicide bombing of courts in Chittagong and Gazipur is carried out by Jamaat-ul-Mujahideen Bangladesh, killed 8 people and injured over 100.
8 December – A suicide bombing in Netrokona results in the deaths of eight people.

Awards and recognitions

International Recognition
 Matiur Rahman, the Editor of Daily Prothom Alo, was awarded Ramon Magsaysay Award.

Independence Day Award

Ekushey Padak
 Saifur Rahman (language movement)
 Khandaker Delwar Hossain (language movement)
 Syed Mujtaba Ali (literature)
 Abdullah Abu Sayeed (education)
 Iqbal Mahmud (education)
 Zubaida Gulshan Ara (literature)
 Mohammad Abdul Gafur (language movement)
 Abu Saleh (literature)
 Ashab Uddin Ahmed (literature)
 Chittaranjan Saha (education)
 Srimat Bishuddh-ananda Mahathero (social service)
 Bashir Ahmed (music)
 Apel Mahmood (music)
 Md Mashir Hossain (journalism)

Sports
 International football:
  Bangladesh lost to India in the final of the 2005 South Asian Football Federation Gold Cup to become runner up in the 8 nation tournament held in Pakistan.
 Bangladesh also became runner up in Myanmar Grand Royal Challenge Cup held in Myanmar.
 Domestic football:
Brothers Union won the Dhaka League while Dhaka Mohammedan became runner-up.
 Dhaka Mohammedan won National Football Championship while Dhaka Abahani became runner-up.
 Brothers Union represented Bangladesh in the 2005 AFC Cup.
 Cricket:
 The Zimbabwe cricket team toured Bangladesh in January 2005 to play two Test matches and five One Day International matches. Bangladesh won the test series 1-0 with one match drawn.  This was the first time Bangladesh had won both a Test match and a Test series. They also won the ODI series by 3–2 margin.
 The Bangladesh national cricket team toured England for the first time in 2005. Bangladesh played two Test matches against England, which the hosts won comfortably. Later Bangladesh took on England and Australia in the tri-nations NatWest Series, where they pulled off a stunning 5-wicket upset victory over Australia, the world champions. In 18 June match, Australia scored 249 in 50 overs and then Bangladesh won with 4 balls to spare, after a century by Mohammad Ashraful. Bangladesh were knocked out of the tournament after three subsequent losses.
 Later, the Bangladeshi cricket team toured Sri Lanka for three One Day International cricket matches and two Test cricket matches in August and September. They lost all these matches against the host.

Deaths
27 January – Shah A M S Kibria, economist, diplomat and politician (b. 1931)
12 February – Monem Munna, footballer (b. 1966)
4 March – Serajul Huq, academician (b. 1905)
29 March – Khalid Hassan Milu, singer (b. 1960)
27 April – Abdus Samad Azad, politician (b. 1922)
8 May – Rafiqul Bari Chowdhury, cinematographer (b. 1940)
18 July – Abdur Rahman, actor (b. 1937)
 17 November – Gautam Das, journalist and bureau chief for Dainik Samakal in Faridpur (born c.1978; murdered)

See also 
 2000s in Bangladesh
 List of Bangladeshi films of 2005
 Timeline of Bangladeshi history

References

 
2000s in Bangladesh
Years of the 21st century in Bangladesh
Bangladesh
Bangladesh